Oz Pearlman (born July 19, 1982) is an American mentalist, magician, and athlete who lives and works in the United States.  He performs as a mentalist under the name "Oz the Mentalist", and has successfully appeared on America's Got Talent, winning third-place in Season 10 (2015).

Pearlman has also achieved success as a long-distance runner in marathons and ultramarathons.

Personal life

Early life 
Oz Pearlman was born on July 19, 1982 in Israel. He moved to the United States at the age of 3 as a result of his father pursuing an engineering job.

Education 
Pearlman earned a bachelor’s degree in electrical engineering from the University of Michigan in 2003, while already earning income from magic.  He began performing magic at restaurants, kids’ shows, and corporate events at the age of 14, and has stated that he always had a deck of cards on him between the ages of 13 and 18.

Career 
Pearlman was originally employed at Merrill Lynch in their global technology services department, at that time only performing magic and mentalism as a part-time profession.  After he was hired by his employer to deliver a corporate entertainment show to upper management within the company, he quit his full-time job at Merrill Lynch in order to focus on being a full-time entertainer.  Since then he has focused on a full-time career performing as a mentalist.

Marathon athlete 
Pearlman won the New Jersey Marathon four times.  He won the 50-mile Chicago Ultra Marathon in 2015 in 5 hours, 25 minutes, and 26 seconds, and has ranked within the top 30 fastest Americans for 50-mile races. He has also participated in the Hawaii Ironman World Championship, Western States 100 Mile Run, Spartathlon 153 Mile Run, Leadville 100 Mile Run, and Badwater 135 Mile Run.

Media appearances 
Pearlman won third-place on America's Got Talent, Season 10 (2015). On January 13, 2020, he returned as a contestant in America's Got Talent: The Champions. 

NBC TV (national) aired a travel show called Oz Knows in 2018, which was about Pearlman traveling to various tourist attractions and performing mentalism, and won an Emmy Award in 2019.

Pearlman was a guest on Late Night with Jimmy Fallon on April 15, 2010. He also made guest appearances on NBC Today Show on August 23, 2015, and in 2016, and predicted the American Super Bowl result on January 26, 2017. Other TV appearances include the Megyn Kelly TODAY Show, The Meredith Vieira Show, and the Rachael Ray Show. On September 25th Pearlman appeared as a guest on ESPN Sunday NFL countdown.  

Pearlman has appeared multiple times on Fox Business talk show Varney & Co., and on CNBC Squawk Box. Further media appearances include The Dr. Oz Show, the Bravo TV series Million Dollar Listing, the CNBC show Power Lunch, ABC World News Tonight, CBS’s Early Show,  ESPN, and the radio show Elvis Duran and the Morning Show.

He has performed as a guest at the Wall Street Journals studio. Pearlman was featured on a commercial for Mohegan Sun in China.

He has also appeared on an episode of Matt & Shane’s Secret Podcast.

Teaching 
Pearlman made numerous instructional video tutorials while working for magic retailer Penguin Magic, particularly in the area of card magic.  In 2003 Pearlman created an instructional DVD for Penguin called Born to Perform Card Magic that teaches techniques of magic. The filming for the DVD took place in Las Vegas. The DVD sold over 100,000 copies. The ratings were among the highest in the history of the magic supplier selling the DVDs.

References

External links

1982 births
Living people
American Jews
American magicians
America's Got Talent contestants
Israeli emigrants to the United States
Mentalists
Merrill (company) people
University of Michigan College of Engineering alumni